José Endundo Bononge (born 8 August 1943) is a politician born in Équateur province in the Democratic Republic of the Congo (DRC). He is the chairman of the Christian Democratic Party (Parti Démocrate Chrétien – PDC) and was elected MP for the constituency of Mbandaka.

Biography
Endundo was born on 8 August 1943 in Tondo in Bikoro Territory in Équateur province.
He is a pharmacist by training.
He held various positions in government departments in the DRC, including the Congolese Control Office (formerly OZAC) and the Office of Roads. He also served as The President of the Franco-Zaïroise Chamber of Commerce.

Endundo joined the Rally for Congolese Democracy (RCD) for a brief time before joining the Movement for the Liberation of the Congo (MLC) of Jean-Pierre Bemba in which he became one of the most influential players. When the Transitional Government was established, he was appointed as The Minister of Public Works and Infrastructure. He left that post after a parliamentary committee accused him of corruption.

He joined with other politicians to create a new political party called the National Union of Christian Democrats (UNADEC). Léon Engulu was its president. After differences of view within the party leadership, he created a new party called the Christian Democratic Party (PDC).

Endundo is also a member of the political bureau for Together for Change, the opposition political coalition formed by former Katanga governor Moïse Katumbi to support his presidential bid in the upcoming 2018 presidential election.

References

Living people
1943 births
Movement for the Liberation of the Congo politicians
People from the province of Équateur
Rally for Congolese Democracy politicians
Government ministers of the Democratic Republic of the Congo
21st-century Democratic Republic of the Congo people